Amer Qasem Wrikat is a Jordanian footballer who plays as a midfielder for Balama SC.

References
 Wrikat of Al-Baqa'a SC Officially Signs Up for Al-Faisaly (Amman)  
 Wrikat Transfers to That Ras
 Wrikat Terminates His Contract With That Ras and Returns to Al-Faisaly (Amman) 
 Wrikat Officially Returns to Al-Baqa'a SC

External links
 

1986 births
Living people
Jordanian footballers
Jordan international footballers
Association football forwards
Jordanian people of Palestinian descent
Footballers at the 2006 Asian Games
Sportspeople from Amman
Asian Games competitors for Jordan